The Prince of Han Dynasty is a three-season Chinese television series featuring a fictionalised life story of Liu Che, Emperor Wu of the Han Dynasty. Season 1 was first broadcast on Beijing Television in 2001 in mainland China, followed by the second and third seasons in 2003 and 2005 respectively. Except for Huang Xiaoming, who played Emperor Wu in all three seasons, the cast members in each season are almost different from its preceding one.

Titles
The Chinese titles for each season are as follows:

 Season 1: 大汉天子 (The Prince of Han Dynasty)
 Season 2: 大汉天子第二部:汉武雄风 (The Prince of Han Dynasty Part 2: The Majesty of Emperor Wu of Han)
 Season 3: 大汉天子第三部:铁血汗青 (The Prince of Han Dynasty Part 3: Iron Blood and the Pages of History)

Cast

Season 1

 Huang Xiaoming as Liu Che
 Chen Daoming as Dongfang Shuo
 Alyssa Chia as Niannujiao
 Sally Chen as Empress Dowager Dou
 Wang Ling as Wei Zifu
 Chen Zihan as Princess Pingyang
 He Jiayi as Chen Jiao
 Liu Guanxiang as Li Ling
 Liu Yijun as Qiuchan
 Zhang Mingjian as Zhang Tang
 Sun Feihu as Liu An
 Shang Rong as Liu Ling
 Xiu Zongdi as Marquis
 Zhou Zheng as Sima Tan
 Song Xiaochuan as Dou Ying
 Yi Yang as Sima Xiangru
 Jia Hongwei as Guan Fu
 Liu Xiaoxiao as Guo Deren
 Sun Hao as Cao Shou
 Li Daxin as Liu Yi
 Zhang Han as Lei Bei
 Yao Gang as Liu Wu
 Lu Yi as Dong Yan
 Li Wei as Guo Mama
 Song Daguang as Wei Qing
 Ma Jie as Tingwei
 Xu Liang as Huo Qubing
 Sun Jiaolong as Dou Wei
 Xu Lin as Empress Wang Zhi
 Jin Tian as Princess Guantao
 Zhao Zhengyang as Zhang Qian
 Qiao Jie as Li Gan
 Li Shengyu as Sima Qian
 Peng Bo as Zhuo Wenjun
 Sun Wanqing as Emperor Jing of Han
 Zhao Dongbo as Mysterious man
 Chi Guodong as Li Guang
 Hao Yang as Zhang Tang's wife
 Ya Bing as Yanzhi
 Chang Hong as Laobao

Season 2

 Huang Xiaoming as Emperor Wu of Han
 Ning Jing as Empress Wei Zifu
 He Jiayi as Li Wa / Empress Chen Jiao
 Dong Yong as Wei Qing
 Wang Gang as Zhu Fuyan
 Du Chun as Li Ling
 Liu Yun as Qiuchan
 Li Li as Huo Qubing
 Liu Xiaohu as Ji Anshi
 Yang Hongwu as Ji An
 Zhao Xiaorui as King of Hunxie
 Hu Guangzi as Li Guangli
 Guan Shaozeng as Tian Fen
 Zhu Yana as Yanshi Malan

Season 3

 Huang Xiaoming as Emperor Wu of Han
 Ruping as Empress Wei Zifu
 Sun Haiying as Jiang Chong
 Li Fei as Qiuchan
 Gao Hao as Li Han
 Wu Qianqian as Empress Dowager Wang
 Zhao Yiyang as Liu Ju
 Bo Yan'an as Zhao Nizi
 An Yixuan as Huo Qilian
 Xiong Naijin as Princess Weichang
 Liu Guanlin as Ji Qinhu
 Dong Yong as Wei Qing
 Zhou Ying as Liu Xijun
 Chen Lili as Ziwei
 Norman Chui as King of Yelang

External links
  The Prince of Han Dynasty on Sina.com
 The Prince of Han Dynasty movie reviews on spcnet.tv

2001 Chinese television series debuts
2005 Chinese television series endings
Asia Television original programming
Television series set in the Western Han dynasty
Chinese historical television series
Mandarin-language television shows
Emperor Wu of Han